Ninaithale Inikkum may refer to:

Ninaithale Inikkum (1979 film), an Indian Tamil-language film
Ninaithale Inikkum (2009 film), an Indian Tamil-language film
Ninaithale Inikkum (talk show), a 2014–2015 Indian Tamil-language talk show
Ninaithale Inikkum (TV series), a Tamil-language TV series